In fluid dynamics, disk loading or disc loading is the average pressure change across an actuator disk, such as an airscrew. Airscrews with a relatively low disk loading are typically called rotors, including helicopter main rotors and tail rotors; propellers typically have a higher disk loading. 
The V-22 Osprey tiltrotor aircraft has a high disk loading relative to a helicopter in the hover mode, but a relatively low disk loading in fixed-wing mode compared to a turboprop aircraft.

Rotors
Disc loading of a hovering helicopter 
is the ratio of its weight to the
total main rotor disc area. It is determined by dividing
the total helicopter weight by the rotor disc area,
which is the area swept by the blades of a rotor. Disc
area can be found by using the span of one rotor blade
as the radius of a circle and then determining the area
the blades encompass during a complete rotation. When a helicopter is being maneuvered, its disc loading changes.
The higher the loading, the more power needed to
maintain rotor speed. A low disc loading is a direct indicator of high lift thrust efficiency.

Increasing the weight of a helicopter increases disk loading. For a given weight, a helicopter with shorter rotors will have higher disk loading, and will require more engine power to hover. A low disk loading improves autorotation performance in rotorcraft. Typically, an autogyro (or gyroplane) has a lower rotor disc loading than a helicopter, which provides a slower rate of descent in autorotation.

Propellers
In reciprocating and propeller engines, disk loading can be defined as the ratio between propeller-induced velocity and freestream velocity. Lower disk loading will increase efficiency, so it is generally desirable to have larger propellers from an efficiency standpoint. Maximum efficiency is reduced as disk loading is increased due to the rotating slipstream; using contra-rotating propellers can alleviate this problem allowing high maximum efficiency even at relatively high disc loadings.

The Airbus A400M fixed-wing aircraft will have a very high disk loading on its propellers.

Theory
The momentum theory or disk actuator theory describes a mathematical model of an ideal actuator disk, developed by W.J.M. Rankine (1865), Alfred George Greenhill (1888) and R.E. Froude (1889). The helicopter rotor is modeled as an infinitessimally thin disk with an infinite number of blades that induce a constant pressure jump over the disk area and along the axis of rotation. For a helicopter that is hovering, the aerodynamic force is vertical and exactly balances the helicopter weight, with no lateral force.

The downward force on the air flowing through the rotor is accompanied by an upward force on the helicopter rotor disk. The downward force produces a downward acceleration of the air, increasing its kinetic energy. This energy transfer from the rotor to the air is the induced power loss of the rotary wing, which is analogous to the lift-induced drag of a fixed-wing aircraft.

Conservation of linear momentum relates the induced velocity downstream in the far wake field to the rotor thrust per unit of mass flow. Conservation of energy considers these parameters as well as the induced velocity at the rotor disk. Conservation of mass relates the mass flow to the induced velocity. The momentum theory applied to a helicopter gives the relationship between induced power loss and rotor thrust, which can be used to analyze the performance of the aircraft. Viscosity and compressibility of the air, frictional losses, and rotation of the slipstream in the wake are not considered.

Momentum theory

By conservation of mass, the mass flow rate is constant across the slipstream both upstream and downstream of the disk (regardless of velocity). Since the flow far upstream of a helicopter in a level hover is at rest, the starting velocity, momentum, and energy are zero. If the homogeneous slipstream far downstream of the disk has velocity , by conservation of momentum the total thrust  developed over the disk is equal to the rate of change of momentum, which assuming zero starting velocity is:

By conservation of energy, the work done by the rotor must equal the energy change in the slipstream:

So the velocity of the slipstream far downstream of the disk is twice the velocity at the disk, which is the same result as for an elliptically loaded wing predicted by lifting-line theory.

Bernoulli's principle

To compute the disk loading using Bernoulli's principle, we assume the pressure in the slipstream far downstream is equal to the starting pressure , which is equal to the atmospheric pressure. From the starting point to the disk we have:

Between the disk and the distant wake, we have:

Combining equations, the disk loading  is:

The total pressure in the distant wake is:

So the pressure change across the disk is equal to the disk loading. Above the disk the pressure change is:

Below the disk, the pressure change is:

The pressure along the slipstream is always falling downstream, except for the positive pressure jump across the disk.

Power required
From the momentum theory, thrust is:

The induced velocity is:

Where  is the disk loading as before, and the power  required in hover (in the ideal case) is:

Therefore, the induced velocity can be expressed as:

So, the induced velocity is inversely proportional to the power loading .

Examples

See also 
Wing loading

References

Aerospace engineering